Gray Hill is a hill immediately to the north of the village of Llanvair Discoed, Monmouthshire, South Wales, rising to  above sea level.

Location 
Gray Hill is on the eastern side of Wentwood Reservoir opposite Mynydd Alltir Fach which sits on the western side of the reservoir. Wentwood rises behind these two hills. The nearest large village or town is Caerwent.  The summit of the hill has views over the Caldicot Levels and Severn estuary, as well as inland.

Geology
Geologically the hill forms a detached part of a longer north and west-facing sandstone scarp which runs roughly northeast through Monmouthshire from Llandevaud to the Wye valley south of Monmouth. Gray Hill is formed from various sandstones of the Old Red Sandstone (or 'ORS') which were laid down during the Devonian period. The northern and western slopes and the lower southern slopes are formed by the lower ORS Brownstones Formation. Unconformably overlying these rocks are the upper ORS Quartz Conglomerates which are pebbly in nature, themselves overlain by the sandstones of the Tintern Sandstone Group. Each of these layers is tilted to the south.

Remains
Gray Hill is known locally for its prehistoric remains which include standing stones, a stone circle at a height of about 900 feet above sea level and overlooking the Severn Estuary, as well as cairns, field boundaries and enclosures including a D-shaped Neolithic or Bronze Age enclosure. The stone circle is approximately 32 feet in diameter and has been dated to the Bronze Age, circa 4000 years ago.  There is also medieval evidence.

See also
 Castell Henllys

References 

 Chris Barber : Exploring Gwent (A Walkers Guide to Gwent Land of History and Legend) 1984

External links

Archaeoastronomy of stone circles in South Wales, incl. Gray Hill
The Megalithic Portal on Gray Hill Stone Circle
Prehistoric Past - Gray Hill Landscape Research Project
Photo of Gray Hill in summer
Other finds from the Gray Hill area
Gray Hill Virtual Geocache location

Mountains and hills of Monmouthshire